Brant—Wentworth was a federal electoral district  in Ontario, Canada, that was represented in the House of Commons of Canada from 1949 to 1953. This riding was created in 1947 from parts of Brant and Wentworth ridings.

It consisted of the town of Paris and the townships of South Dumfries, Onondaga, and Tuscarora and the part of the township of Brantford lying north and east of the left bank of Grand River in the county of Brant; and the townships of Beverly, Ancaster, Glanford and Binbrook in the county of Wentworth.

The electoral district was abolished in 1952 when it was redistributed between Brant—Haldimand and Wentworth ridings.

Members of Parliament

Election results

|}

See also 

 List of Canadian federal electoral districts
 Past Canadian electoral districts

External links 
Riding history from the Library of Parliament

Former federal electoral districts of Ontario
1947 establishments in Ontario
Constituencies established in 1947
1953 disestablishments in Ontario
Constituencies disestablished in 1953